Remigio is a given name. Notable people with the given name include:

Remigio Guido Barbieri (1836–1910), Italian-born Roman Catholic bishop
Remigio Morales Bermúdez (1836–1894), Peruvian politician
Remigio Cantagallina (c. 1582–1656), Italian etcher
Remigio Fernández (born 1965), Paraguayan football manager and former footballer
Remigio dei Girolami (1235–1319), Italian Dominican theologian
Remigio Ángel González, Mexican businessman
Remigio Herrera (1811/1816– 1905), Cuban freedman
Remigio Molina (1970–2016), Argentine boxer
Remigio Crespo Toral (1860–1939), Ecuadorian writer

See also
Remigio (surname)